"Is This Love" is a song by American rock band Survivor. The song was released on October 1, 1986 as the first single from Survivor's sixth album, When Seconds Count.

Background
"Is This Love" was written by keyboard player Jim Peterik and guitarist Frankie Sullivan. Peterik has explained "Is This Love" as follows: "That's another song that I wrote out of experience. 'We run those mean streets, blind alleys where the currency of love changes hands, all touch, no feeling, just another one night stand,' we've all felt that. I felt that when I was dating and on the road and empty relationships that you knew weren't going to go anywhere. What is love? It's a guy questioning that."

Charts
In January 1987, "Is This Love" peaked at No. 9 on the Billboard Hot 100, becoming their fifth and last top 10 hit.

References 

Survivor (band) songs
1986 songs
1986 singles
Scotti Brothers Records singles
Song recordings produced by Ron Nevison
Songs written by Frankie Sullivan
Songs written by Jim Peterik